Chipili is a constituency of the National Assembly of Zambia. It covers the town of Chipili in Luapula Province.

List of MPs

References

Constituencies of the National Assembly of Zambia
1973 establishments in Zambia
Constituencies established in 1973